A mannosyltransferase is a type of glycosyltransferase that acts upon mannose.

An example is heteroglycan alpha-mannosyltransferase.

References

EC 2.4.1